Patrick "Pat" Dwyer (born June 22, 1983) is an American former professional ice hockey right winger who played in the National Hockey League with the Carolina Hurricanes. He was originally selected by the Atlanta Thrashers in the fourth round, 116th overall, of the 2002 NHL Entry Draft.

He remains within the Hurricanes organization, currently serving as an assistant coach to the Chicago Wolves of the American Hockey League (AHL).

Playing career
After 9 seasons within the Carolina Hurricanes organization, Dwyer left the club having played in 416 regular season games as a free agent. Dwyer was unable to attain an NHL contract over the summer and on September 19, 2015, accepted a try-out offer to attend the Arizona Coyotes training camp. At the conclusion of training camp, Dwyer was released from his try-out contract with the Coyotes. With the 2015–16 season underway, Dwyer belatedly signed a contract abroad in Sweden for the remainder of the campaign with Modo Hockey of the SHL on October 22, 2015. Adding depth in a checking line role, Dwyer was unable to contribute offensively, producing just 7 assists in 33 games as Modo were relegated to the HockeyAllsvenskan.

As a free agent over the summer, Dwyer returned to North America and agreed to an invitation to attend the Columbus Blue Jackets training camp on a professional try-out on September 21, 2016. Upon his release from the Blue Jackets, Dwyer returned to the Hurricanes fold in preparation for the 2016–17 season, signing a one-year AHL contract with affiliate, the Charlotte Checkers on October 11, 2016.

After a spell in Denmark, Dwyer moved to the UK to sign for the Belfast Giants on 26 July 2018. In his last professional season in 2018–19, Dwyer added a veteran and dominating scoring presence to the Giants, posting 25 goals and 61 points in 38 games. While also serving in a player-assistant coach role, Dwyer was named to the EIHL Second All-Star Team and captured the EIHL championship.

Coaching career
Having served as an assistant coach during his last playing season with the Belfast Giants, Dwyer returned to North America following his retirement and re-joined the Carolina Hurricanes organization in accepting an assistant coaching role with former club, the Charlotte Checkers of the AHL, on July 30, 2019. In 2020, he was named an assistant coach with the Hurricanes' new AHL affiliate, the Chicago Wolves.

Personal life
Dwyer was born in Spokane, Washington and raised in Great Falls, Montana

Career statistics

Regular season and playoffs

International

Awards and honors

References

External links

1983 births
Living people
Albany River Rats players
American men's ice hockey right wingers
Atlanta Thrashers draft picks
Belfast Giants players
Carolina Hurricanes players
Charlotte Checkers (2010–) players
Chicago Wolves players
Gwinnett Gladiators players
Ice hockey people from Montana
Ice hockey people from Washington (state)
Modo Hockey players
SønderjyskE Ishockey players
Sportspeople from Great Falls, Montana
Sportspeople from Spokane, Washington
Western Michigan Broncos men's ice hockey players
American expatriate ice hockey players in Denmark
American expatriate ice hockey players in Sweden
American expatriate ice hockey players in Northern Ireland